Carbon is a scientific journal published by Elsevier. According to the journal's website, "Carbon publishes papers that deal with original research on carbonaceous solids with an emphasis on graphene-based materials. These materials include, but are not limited to, carbon nanotubes, carbon fibers and filaments, graphites, activated carbons, pyrolytic carbons, glass-like carbons, carbon blacks, and chars."

Carbon has an impact factor [2021] of 11.307.  The Editor-in-Chief is Mauricio Terrones of Penn State University (USA) and the Senior Editor is Gareth Neighbour of the Open University (UK) and these are supported by an editorial board of 14 highly respected carbon scientists from highly respected institutions.

External links 
 

Elsevier academic journals
Chemistry journals
Materials science journals
English-language journals
Publications established in 1964
Nanotechnology journals
Journals published between 13 and 25 times per year